is one of the wealthiest neighborhoods of Tokyo, located in the northwest portion of Minato Ward. The area is well known for its international fashion houses, cafes and restaurants. 

 or "North Aoyama" refers to the area on the north side of Aoyama-dori (Aoyama Street) between the Akasaka Palace and Aoyama Gakuin University, while  or "South Aoyama" refers to the area to the south of Aoyama-dori and extends to the northern edge of Roppongi, Azabu and Hiroo. 

During the Edo period, Aoyama was home to various temples, shrines, and samurai residences. The name Aoyama is derived from a samurai named Aoyama Tadanari who served the Tokugawa Shogunate and held his mansion in the area. Today, along with Shibuya and Harajuku, it is one of the most popular entertainment and shopping areas "Omotesandō", for young people in Tokyo. It is well known for its fashion houses, restaurants, and shopping. Chichibunomiya Rugby Stadium is in the North part of Aoyama.

Places in Aoyama

 Aoyama Twin Towers (Aoyama Twin Buildings)
 Clarence international school (Pre school)
 Aoyama junior high school (Japanese Public school)
 Aoyama elementary school (Japanese Public school)
 Seinan elementary school (Japanese Public school)

 Spiral
 Blue Note Tokyo
 Nezu Museum
 Xbox 360 Lounge
 Zenkō-ji Aoyama-Betsuin, managed by Jōdo-shū school of Buddhism, branch temple of the Shinano Zenkō-ji. It is located in Omotesandō intersection.
 Aoyama Cemetery
 Meiji Shrine Outer Gardens (明治神宮外苑, Meiji Jingu Gaien)
 Chichibunomiya Rugby Stadium

Companies and organizations based in Aoyama

 Oracle Corporation Japan
 Berlitz (Asia Headquarters)
 Itochu
 Honda Motor
 Sony Financial Holdings
 Sony Life Insurance
 Nikka Whisky Distilling

 Avex Group

 JCB
 Comme des Garçons
 RIAJ
 Hip Land Music Corp.
 Victor Entertainment
 Acne Studios
 Teikoku Databank

 Embassy of Brazil in Tokyo
 Embassy of Canada to Japan
 Embassy of Morocco in Tokyo
 Italian Trade Commission Tokyo Office 
 Italian State Tourist Board Tokyo Office
 Four Seeds Corporation (Pizza-La, etc.)
 Prada
 Cube Japan

Subway stations
 Aoyama-itchōme Station (Ginza Line, Hanzōmon Line, Toei Ōedo Line)
 Omotesandō Station (Chiyoda Line, Ginza Line, Hanzōmon Line)
 Gaiemmae Station (Ginza Line)
 Nogizaka Station (Chiyoda Line) – located in the southeastern corner of Minami-Aoyama adjacent to Roppongi, and Akasaka

Education
Minato City Board of Education operates public elementary and junior high schools. Kita Aoyama and Minami Aoyama are zoned to different schools.

References

Neighborhoods of Tokyo
Geography of Minato, Tokyo